Glencoe Creek, also known as Marowin Brook is a creek in Upper Rollands Plains, New South Wales, Australia. It is located in the Port Macquarie-Hastings Council area in the Mid North Coast region of New South Wales.

The area is covered in blackbutt and tallowwood trees some 80 meters in height, and is located mostly within Kumbatine National Park.

The climate is subtropical.

References

Rivers of New South Wales
Mid North Coast